The Caprock Escarpment is a term used in West Texas and Eastern New Mexico to describe the geographical transition point between the level High Plains of the Llano Estacado and the surrounding rolling terrain. The escarpment is especially notable, from north to south, in Briscoe, Floyd, Motley, Crosby, Dickens, Garza, and Borden Counties. In New Mexico,  a prominent escarpment exists along the northernmost extension of the Llano Estacado, especially to the south of San Jon and Tucumcari, both in Quay County, New Mexico. Along the western edge of the Llano Estacado, the portion of the escarpment that stretches from Caprock to Maljamar, New Mexico, is called the Mescalero Ridge.

Description
The escarpment is made of caliche—a layer of calcium carbonate that resists erosion. The escarpment's features formed by erosion from rivers and streams, creating arroyos and highly diverse terrain, including the large Palo Duro Canyon southeast of Amarillo, Texas. One will notice the change in elevation of several hundred feet while crossing the Caprock Escarpment on Interstate 40 between Adrian, Texas and San Jon, New Mexico.

The overall slight upslope, and in some areas, convergent, terrain of the Caprock is implicated in altering local weather and climate, such as enhancing precipitation and promoting thunderstorm initiation and organization.

Parks
Caprock Canyons State Park and Trailway, located near Quitaque, opened in 1982. A 65-mi (105-km) trail was developed within the park in 1992. Along the trail is Clarity Tunnel, home to a large colony of Mexican free-tailed bats.

See also

Blanco Canyon
Canyon Valley
Caprock Chief
Double Mountain Fork
Duffy's Peak
Eastern New Mexico
Geographical regions in Texas
Little Red River
Mount Blanco
Mushaway Peak
Palmer Divide
Palo Duro Canyon
Prairie Dog Town Fork Red River
Ransom Canyon
Salt Fork Brazos River
Yellow House Canyon
West Texas

References

External links
 
 
 Public domain images of the Llano Estacado, West Texas, and Eastern New Mexico

Escarpments of the United States
Landforms of Texas
Landforms of New Mexico
Llano Estacado